Articles on Scottish Oil include:

 Scottish Oils Ltd, a shale oil company
 It's Scotland's oil, a political slogan relating to North Sea oil